Timothy ("Tim") Hilton Hutchings (born 4 December 1958 in London) is a male former middle- and long-distance runner who represented England and Great Britain internationally.

Athletics career
Hutchings' track events were the 1500 metres, 5000 metres and 10,000 metres. His main championship performances in track and field were a 5000 m bronze medal in the 1986 European Championship and a bronze medal in the 5000 m at the 1986 Commonwealth Games. He also finished fourth in the 1984 Olympic Games.

After appearing in the 1500 metres at the 1978 Commonwealth Games he represented England in the 5,000 metres event, at the 1982 Commonwealth Games in Brisbane, Queensland, Australia. Four years later he represented England, where he won his bronze medal in the 5,000 metres event, at the 1986 Commonwealth Games in Edinburgh, Scotland. A fourth and final appearance came at the 1990 Commonwealth Games in Auckland, New Zealand.

In cross country running, he twice earned a silver medal in the IAAF World Cross Country Championships, in 1984 and 1989. He also won the 1985 edition of the Belfast International Cross Country race. In 1989, he picked up a hamstring injury that put a premature end to his career.

Personal life
After retiring from competition, Hutchings co-founded the Brighton Marathon in 2010 with Tom Naylor.

Tim Hutchings was educated at a boys' independent boarding school: Worth in West Sussex.

Nowadays, he works as an athletics commentator for British Eurosport.

References

External links

 Results page on sporting-heroes.net
 Athlete profile on athleticsdata.com
 gbrathletics

1958 births
Living people
Athletes from London
English male middle-distance runners
English male long-distance runners
Olympic athletes of Great Britain
Athletes (track and field) at the 1984 Summer Olympics
Commonwealth Games bronze medallists for England
Commonwealth Games medallists in athletics
Athletes (track and field) at the 1978 Commonwealth Games
Athletes (track and field) at the 1982 Commonwealth Games
Athletes (track and field) at the 1986 Commonwealth Games
Athletes (track and field) at the 1990 Commonwealth Games
World Athletics Championships athletes for Great Britain
European Athletics Championships medalists
People educated at Worth School
Track and field broadcasters
Medallists at the 1986 Commonwealth Games